The 2019 Pan American Track Cycling Championships took place at the Velodrome of the Sports Training Center (CEFED) in Cochabamba, Bolivia,  from 4 to 8 September 2019.

Medal summary

Men

Women

Medal table

Records

References

External links
Official website 
Results book 

Pan American Road and Track Championships
Americas
Cycling
International sports competitions hosted by Bolivia
Sport in Cochabamba
September 2019 sports events in South America